Chkvishi is a village in the Vani Municipality, Imereti Region, Georgia first mentioned in the 16th century. The Galaktion and Titsian Tabidze House Museum is located in the village.

Population 
As of the 2014 national census, Chkvishi had a population of 376, almost entirely Georgians.

Notable residents 
Galaktion Tabidze, poet born in Chkvishi
Titsian Tabidze, poet born in Chkvishi

Populated places in Vani Municipality